Doug Mays (born August 18, 1950) is an American politician who served in the Kansas House of Representatives as a Republican from the 54th district from 1993 to 2006.

Mays was originally elected in the November 1992 general election. He served for seven terms in the House, including serving as Speaker of the House from 2003 to 2006; in 2006, he declined to run for re-election and was succeeded by fellow Republican Joe Patton.

References

Living people
1950 births
Republican Party members of the Kansas House of Representatives
20th-century American politicians
21st-century American politicians
Politicians from Topeka, Kansas